The 2020 Massachusetts Republican presidential primary took place on March 3, 2020, as one of fourteen contests scheduled for Super Tuesday in the Republican Party presidential primaries for the 2020 presidential election.

Results
Incumbent United States President Donald Trump was challenged by three candidates: businessman and perennial candidate Rocky De La Fuente of California, former congressman Joe Walsh of Illinois, and former governor Bill Weld of Massachusetts. Walsh withdrew from the race prior to the primary. De La Fuente was not on the initial ballot list, but he successfully petitioned to get onto the ballot following its release. Donald Trump won Massachusetts in a landslide over Former Governor Bill Weld, winning almost every town, losing only Pelham and Gosnold.

Results by county

See also
 2020 Massachusetts Democratic presidential primary

References

Massachusetts Republican
Republican primary
Massachusetts Republican primaries